The index of physics articles is split into multiple pages due to its size.

To navigate by individual letter use the table of contents below.

E

E-folding
E. Peter Raynes
E872 experiment
E=MC2 (disambiguation)
EAST
EBOR
ECHIDNA
EDELWEISS
EGS (program)
ELETTRA
EMF meter
EMMA (accelerator)
ENGIN-X
EN 207
EPICS
EPOXI
EPR paradox
EP quantum mechanics
ERF damper
ETDEWEB
ETH Laboratory of Ion Beam Physics
Earl W. McDaniel
Earle Hesse Kennard
Earle M. Terry
Earnshaw's theorem
Earth's magnetic field
Earth's shadow
Earth, Moon, and Planets
Earth-Moon barycenter
Earth and Planetary Science Letters
Earth tide
Earth–ionosphere waveguide
Eastman Jacobs
Easy Java Simulations
Easy axis
Ebullioscopic constant
Eccentric anomaly
Eccentricity vector
Echea
Echo (phenomenon)
Echo chamber
Echogenicity
Eckert number
Eckman number
Eclipse
Ecliptic
Economizer
Econophysics
Ectropy
Ed Grothus
Ed Lu
Ed Seidel
Eddington luminosity
Eddington number
Eddington–Finkelstein coordinates
Eddy (fluid dynamics)
Eddy current
Eddy diffusion
Eden growth model
Edgar Buckingham
Edgar Choueiri
Edgar D. Zanotto
Edge-localized mode
Edge-of-the-wedge theorem
Edge wave
Edme Mariotte
Edmond Halley
Edmund Clifton Stoner
Edoardo Amaldi
Édouard Branly
Édouard Brézin
Eduard Grüneisen
Eduard Prugovečki
Eduard Shpolsky
Education and training of electrical and electronics engineers
Edward A. Guggenheim
Edward A. Irving
Edward Alan Knapp
Edward Andrade
Edward Arthur Milne
Edward Bennett (physicist)
Edward Bennett Rosa
Edward Bouchet
Edward Bullard
Edward Condon
Edward Drobyshevski
Edward George Bowen
Edward Hinds
Edward J. Lofgren
Edward Kasner
Edward Kolb
Edward L. Wright
Edward Leamington Nichols
Edward Lee (scientist)
Edward Mills Purcell
Edward Morley
Edward Nairne
Edward P. Ney
Edward Pigot
Edward Ramberg
Edward Salisbury Dana
Edward Samuel Ritchie
Edward Spiegel
Edward Teller
Edward Tryon
Edward Victor Appleton
Edward W. Piotrowski
Edward Witten
Edwin Bidwell Wilson
Edwin C. Kemble
Edwin F. Taylor
Edwin Fitch Northrup
Edwin Hall
Edwin Hubble
Edwin Power
Edwin Thompson Jaynes
Effect of sun angle on climate
Effective action
Effective atomic number (compounds and mixtures)
Effective diffusion coefficient
Effective dose (radiation)
Effective field theory
Effective input noise temperature
Effective mass (solid-state physics)
Effective medium model
Effective nuclear charge
Effective potential
Effective radiated power
Effects of nuclear explosions
Effects of nuclear explosions on human health
Effects of relativity on GPS
Effervescence
Efim Fradkin
Efimov effect
Efimov state
Egbert Kankeleit
Egg drop competition
Egon Bretscher
Egon Orowan
Egon Schweidler
Ehlers group
Ehrenfest equations
Ehrenfest paradox
Ehrenfest theorem
Eigenspinor
Eight-Foot High Speed Tunnel
Eightfold Way (physics)
Einasto profile
Einselection
Einstein's awards and honors
Einstein's box
Einstein's unsuccessful investigations
Einstein's views on the aether
Einstein–Maxwell equations
Einstein@Home
Einstein (unit)
Einstein Cross
Einstein Papers Project
Einstein Symposium
Einstein Telescope
Einstein Tower
Einstein aether theory
Einstein field equations
Einstein force
Einstein manifold
Einstein notation
Einstein protocol
Einstein radius
Einstein refrigerator
Einstein relation (kinetic theory)
Einstein ring
Einstein solid
Einstein synchronisation
Einstein tensor
Einsteinhaus
Einstein–Brillouin–Keller method
Einstein–Cartan theory
Einstein–Cartan–Evans theory
Einstein–Hilbert action
Einstein–Hopf Drag
Einstein–Infeld–Hoffmann equations
Einstein–Szilárd letter
Einzel lens
Ekman layer
Ekman number
Ekman spiral
Ekman spirals
Ekman transport
Ekmel Özbay
Ekpyrotic universe
Elastance
Elastic collision
Elastic energy
Elastic modulus
Elastic potential energy
Elastic recoil detection
Elastic scattering
Elastic wave
Elastica theory
Elasticity (physics)
Elda Emma Anderson
Electret
Electric-field integral equation
Electric-field screening
Electric Tokamak
Electric arc
Electric charge
Electric current
Electric dipole moment
Electric dipole spin resonance
Electric dipole transition
Electric discharge
Electric displacement field
Electric effective resistance
Electric field
Electric field NMR
Electric field gradient
Electric flux
Electric form factor
Electric generator
Electric motor
Electric potential
Electric potential energy
Electric power
Electric shock
Electric spark
Electric susceptibility
Electric torque
Electric torque (disambiguation)
Electrical breakdown
Electrical conductance
Electrical impedance
Electrical mobility
Electrical network
Electrical phenomena
Electrical reactance
Electrical resistivity and conductivity
Electrical resistivity tomography
Electricity
Electro-absorption modulator
Electro-gyration
Electro-optic effect
Electro-optic modulator
Electro-optics
Electro-osmosis
Electrocaloric effect
Electrocardiography
Electroceramics
Electrochemical Society
Electrochemical gradient
Electrochemical impedance spectroscopy
Electrochemical noise
Electrochemiluminescence
Electrochromism
Electrodeionization
Electrodeless plasma excitation
Electrodeless plasma thruster
Electrodynamic suspension
Electrodynamic tether
Electrogravitic tensor
Electrogravitics
Electrohydrodynamic thruster
Electrohydrodynamics
Electrolaser
Electroluminescence
Electroluminescent display
Electrolytic detector
Electromagnetic absorbers
Electromagnetic absorption by water
Electromagnetic brake
Electromagnetic buoyancy
Electromagnetic cavity
Electromagnetic cloak
Electromagnetic compatibility
Electromagnetic environment
Electromagnetic field
Electromagnetic force
Electromagnetic four-potential
Electromagnetic induction
Electromagnetic interference control
Electromagnetic mass
Electromagnetic metamaterials
Electromagnetic pulse
Electromagnetic radiation
Electromagnetic radiation and health
Electromagnetic reverberation chamber
Electromagnetic shielding
Electromagnetic spectroscopy
Electromagnetic spectrum
Electromagnetic stress–energy tensor
Electromagnetic tensor
Electromagnetic wave equation
Electromagnetically induced transparency
Electromagnetics (journal)
Electromagnetism
Electromanipulation
Electromechanical coupling coefficient
Electromigration
Electromotive force
Electron
Electron-capture dissociation
Electron-cloud effect
Electron-longitudinal acoustic phonon interaction
Electron magnetic resonance
Electron Microscopy Center
Electron affinity
Electron avalanche
Electron backscatter diffraction
Electron beam freeform fabrication
Electron beam ion source
Electron beam lithography
Electron beam physical vapor deposition
Electron beam processing
Electron beam technology
Electron binding energy
Electron bubble
Electron capture
Electron cloud
Electron configuration
Electron configurations of the elements (data page)
Electron crystallography
Electron cyclotron resonance
Electron density
Electron diffraction
Electron electric dipole moment
Electron excitation
Electron gun
Electron hole
Electron ionization
Electron magnetic dipole moment
Electron microprobe
Electron microscope
Electron mobility
Electron mobility (solid-state physics)
Electron multiplier
Electron neutrino
Electron optics
Electron paramagnetic resonance
Electron rest mass
Electron scattering
Electron shell
Electron spectrometer
Electron spin resonance
Electron spiral toroid
Electron temperature
Electron tomography
Electron wake
Electron wave-packet interference
Electroneutral exchange
Electronic Journal of Theoretical Physics
Electronic anticoincidence
Electronic band structure
Electronic correlation
Electronic density
Electronic imager
Electronic pest control
Electronic speckle pattern interferometry
Electronic state
Electronvolt
Electron–positron annihilation
Electroosmotic flow
Electrophoresis
Electrorheological fluid
Electrorotation
Electroscope
Electrospray ionization
Electrostatic deflection
Electrostatic discharge
Electrostatic generator
Electrostatic induction
Electrostatic ion thruster
Electrostatic lens
Electrostatic levitation
Electrostatics
Electrostriction
Electrovacuum solution
Electrovibration
Electroweak epoch
Electroweak interaction
Electroweak scale
Electroweak star
Electroweak symmetry breaking
Electrowetting
Eleftheriades, G.V.
Eleftheriades, George
Eleftheriades, George V.
Elektronika (journal)
Elementary charge
Elementary particle
Elements: An International Magazine of Mineralogy, Geochemistry, and Petrology
Elements of Dynamic
Elepter Andronikashvili
Elevator paradox (physics)
Eli Barkai
Eli Franklin Burton
Eli Turkel
Eli Yablonovitch
Elitzur–Vaidman bomb tester
Eliyahu M. Goldratt
Elizabeth Rauscher
Elizabeth Rhoades
Ellery Schempp
Elliott H. Lieb
Ellipsometry
Elliptic orbit
Elliptical polarization
Elliptical wing
Ellis–Karliner angle
Elsa M. Garmire
Elwin Bruno Christoffel
EmDrive
Emagram
Emanoil Bacaloglu
Emanuel Kamber
Emergence
Emergency Core Cooling System
Emerson Cavitation Tunnel
Emil Bose
Emil Cohn
Emil Konopinski
Emil Martinec
Emil Rupp
Emil Warburg
Emil Wiechert
Emil Wolf
Emile Amagat
Émile Verdet
Émilie du Châtelet
Emilio G. Segrè
Emilio Oribe
Emilio Zavattini
Emilios T. Harlaftis
Emission-aware programming
Emission (electromagnetic radiation)
Emission coefficient
Emission spectroscopy
Emission spectrum
Emission spectrum (fluorescence spectroscopy)
Emission theory
Emissivity
Emlyn Rhoderick
Emmanuel Maignan
Emory Leon Chaffee
Empedocles
Empirical formula
Empty lattice approximation
Encircled energy
End correction
Endel Aruja
Endergonic
Endoreversible thermodynamics
Endothermic
Ene Ergma
Energies per unit mass
Energy
Energy-dispersive X-ray spectroscopy
Energy Catalyzer
Energy Citations Database
Energy Research Abstracts
Energy Science and Technology Database
Energy Technology Data Exchange
Energy amplifier
Energy and Environmental Security Initiative
Energy applications of nanotechnology
Energy arc
Energy carrier
Energy condition
Energy conversion efficiency
Energy current
Energy density
Energy drift
Energy eigenstates
Energy landscape
Energy level
Energy level splitting
Energy medicine
Energy operator
Energy recovery linac
Energy scale
Energy spectrum
Energy technologies
Energy technology
Energy transformation
Energy–momentum relation
Engelbert Broda
Engelbert Schücking
Engin Arık
Engineering Science
Engineering diffraction
Engineering physics
Englert–Greenberger duality relation
Enhanced Fujita Scale
Enid MacRobbie
Ennio Candotti
Enriched Xenon Observatory
Enriched uranium
Enrico Costa (physicist)
Enrico Fermi
Enrico Fermi Award
Enrico Fermi Nuclear Power Plant (Italy)
Enrico Persico
Enrique Gaviola
Enrique Loedel Palumbo
Enrique Marcatili
Ensemble (fluid mechanics)
Ensemble average
Ensemble interpretation
Enstrophy
Enthalpy
Enthalpy change of solution
Enthalpy of fusion
Enthalpy of neutralization
Enthalpy of sublimation
Enthalpy of vaporization
Enthalpy–entropy chart
Entrainment (hydrodynamics)
Entrainment (physics)
Entrance pupil
Entropic explosion
Entropic force
Entropic gravity
Entropy
Entropy (arrow of time)
Entropy (astrophysics)
Entropy (classical thermodynamics)
Entropy (energy dispersal)
Entropy (general concept)
Entropy (information theory)
Entropy (journal)
Entropy (order and disorder)
Entropy (statistical thermodynamics)
Entropy and life
Entropy in thermodynamics and information theory
Entropy of a probability distribution
Entropy of fusion
Entropy of mixing
Entropy of vaporization
Environment (systems)
Environmental Research Letters
Environmental and Engineering Geophysical Society
Environmental impact of wind power
Environmental isotopes
Environmental magnetism
Environmental radioactivity
Environmentalists for Nuclear Energy
Ephraim Katzir
Epitaxy
Epsilon radiation
Equal-loudness contour
Equation of State Calculations by Fast Computing Machines
Equation of state
Equation of state (cosmology)
Equation of the center
Equations for a falling body
Equations of motion
Equatorial waves
Equilibrium mode distribution
Equilibrium thermodynamics
Equipartition theorem
Equipotential
Equipotential surface
Equivalence of direct radiation
Equivalence principle
Equivalent circuit
Equivalent dose
Equivalent dumping coefficient
Equivalent noise resistance
Equivalent potential temperature
Equivalent rectangular bandwidth
Equivalent temperature
Er:YAG laser
Erbium-doped waveguide amplifier
Erdal İnönü
Erect image
Erg
Ergodic hypothesis
Ergosphere
Eric Allin Cornell
Eric Fawcett
Eric Isaacs
Eric Kandel
Eric Lerner
Eric M. Rogers
Eric Mazur
Eric Poisson
Eric Van Stryland
Eric Voice
Erich Bagge
Erich Fischer
Erich Hückel
Erich Kretschmann
Erich P. Ippen
Erich Peter Wohlfarth
Erich Regener
Erich Sackmann
Erich Schumann
Erich Vogt
Erich von Drygalski
Erick Weinberg
Ericsson cycle
Eridanus Supervoid
Erik Edlund
Erik Verlinde
Ernest C. Pollard
Ernest Courant
Ernest Hanbury Hankin
Ernest Harry Vestine
Ernest Howard Griffiths
Ernest J. Sternglass
Ernest Lawrence
Ernest Lester Jones
Ernest Marsden
Ernest Rutherford
Ernest Walton
Ernest William Titterton
Ernesto Sabato
Ernie Tuck
Ernst Abbe
Ernst Brüche
Ernst Chladni
Ernst Emil Alexander Back
Ernst G. Bauer
Ernst Gehrcke
Ernst Henry Krause
Ernst Ising
Ernst Lecher
Ernst Mach
Ernst Messerschmid
Ernst R. G. Eckert
Ernst Regener
Ernst Rexer
Ernst Ruska
Ernst Stueckelberg
Ernst Stuhlinger
Ernst W. Hamburger
Erwin Fues
Erwin Hahn
Erwin Madelung
Erwin Marquit
Erwin Saxl
Erwin Schrödinger
Erwin Wilhelm Müller
Escape orbit
Escape velocity
Esteban Terradas i Illa
Esther M. Conwell
Estia J. Eichten
Estonian Physical Society
Eta meson
Eta prime meson
Eternal inflation
Etheric force
Étienne-Gaspard Robert
Étienne-Louis Malus
Ettingshausen effect
Ettore Majorana
Etymology of electricity
Euclidean quantum gravity
Euclidean vector
Eudemus of Rhodes
Eudiometer
Eugen Brodhun
Eugen Goldstein
Eugen Merzbacher
Eugen von Lommel
Eugene C. Bingham
Eugene C. Crittenden
Eugene Feenberg
Eugene Guth
Eugene I. Gordon
Eugene Levich
Eugene Mallove
Eugene McDermott
Eugene Podkletnov
Eugene Rabinowitch
Eugene T. Booth
Eugene Wigner
Eugeniu Plohotniuc
Eugène Cremmer
Euler's Disk
Euler's equations (rigid body dynamics)
Euler's laws of motion
Euler's three-body problem
Euler equations (fluid dynamics)
Euler force
Euler number (physics)
Euler–Bernoulli beam theory
Euler–Heisenberg Lagrangian
Euler–Lagrange equation
Euler–Tricomi equation
Eurisol
European Biophysics Journal
European Combined Geodetic Network
European Geosciences Union
European Journal of Physics
European Muon Collaboration
European Nuclear Society
European Optical Society
European Physical Journal
European Physical Journal A
European Physical Journal B
European Physical Journal C
European Physical Journal D
European Physical Journal E
European Physical Journal H
European Physical Society
European Spallation Source
European Synchrotron Radiation Facility
European Underground Rare Event Calorimeter Array
European x-ray free electron laser
Eva Ekeblad
Eva Nogales
Eva Silverstein
Evan Harris Walker
Evanescent wave
Evanescent wave coupling
Evaporative cooler
Evelyn Hu
Event (particle physics)
Event generator
Event horizon
Event reconstruction
Everette Lee DeGolyer
Evershed effect
Everything
Evgeni Gross
Evgenii Feinberg
Evgeny Aramovich Abramyan
Evgeny Lifshitz
Evgeny Velikhov
Ewald's sphere
Ewald Georg von Kleist
Ewald Wollny
Ewald construction
Ewald summation
Exa Corp.
Exact solutions in general relativity
Exact solutions of Einstein's field equations
Exact solutions of classical central-force problems
Exchange bias
Exchange current density
Exchange force
Exchange interaction
Exchange interactions
Exchange symmetry
Excimer laser
Excitable medium
Excitation function
Excitation (magnetic)
Excitation spectrum
Excitation temperature
Excited state
Exciton
Exclusion area
Exclusive correlation spectroscopy
Exergonic
Exergy
Exergy efficiency
Exoelectron emission
Exothermic
Exotic atom
Exotic baryon
Exotic hadron
Exotic matter
Exotic meson
Exotic particle
Exotic star
Expander cycle (rocket)
Expansion deflection nozzle
Expectation value (quantum mechanics)
Experimental physics
Experiments in Fluids
Experiments of Rayleigh and Brace
Explicit symmetry breaking
Exploration geophysics
Explorer 1
Exponential dichotomy
Exposure assessment
Extended X-ray absorption fine structure
Extended periodic table
Extended supersymmetry
Extensional viscosity
Exterior covariant derivative
External ballistics
External combustion engine
External flow
Extinct radionuclide
Extinction cross
Extra high tension
Extragalactic cosmic ray
Extrasolar planet
Extremal black hole
Extreme Light Infrastructure
Extreme Universe Space Observatory
Extremely high frequency
Extremely low frequency
Eye (cyclone)
Ezer Griffiths
Ezra T. Newman
Eötvös experiment
Eötvös number

Indexes of physics articles